Nandanvan is a 1961 Gujarati drama film directed by Ganpatrao Brahmbhatt and produced by Shrikumar V. Gaglani. The music was directed and composed by Avinash Vyas and features Vijay Dutt and Arvind Pandya in lead roles. The film was awarded the Certificate of Merit for Best Film Feature (Gujarati Feature Film) under the 9th National Film Awards.

References 

1961 films
Films shot in Gujarat
1960s Gujarati-language films